The 1983–84 Coppa Italia, the 37th Coppa Italia was an Italian Football Federation domestic cup competition won by Roma.

Group stage

Group 1

Group 2

Group 3

Group 4

Group 5

Group 6

Group 7

Group 8

Round of 16

Quarter-finals

Semi-finals

Final

First leg

Second leg

AS Roma won 2–1 on aggregate.

Top goalscorers

References 

 rsssf.com
 Official site
 Bracket

Coppa Italia seasons
Coppa Italia
Coppa Italia